The women's team sabre competition of the fencing event at the 2015 Southeast Asian Games was held on 7 June 2015 at the OCBC Arena Hall 2 in Kallang, Singapore.

Schedule

Results

Final standing

References

External links
 

Women's team sabre
Women's sports competitions in Singapore
South